Umbonula is a genus of bryozoans belonging to the family Umbonulidae.

The genus has almost cosmopolitan distribution.

Species:

Umbonula alvareziana 
Umbonula austriensis 
Umbonula bartonensis 
Umbonula boucheti 
Umbonula calcariformis 
Umbonula cyrtoporoidea 
Umbonula elongata 
Umbonula endlicheri 
Umbonula gigantea 
Umbonula granulata 
Umbonula leda 
Umbonula macrocheila 
Umbonula margaritata 
Umbonula megastoma 
Umbonula miser 
Umbonula multispina 
Umbonula ovicellata 
Umbonula paraboucheti 
Umbonula patens 
Umbonula pliocenica 
Umbonula reteporacites 
Umbonula spinosa 
Umbonula undulata 
Umbonula wemmeliensis

References

Bryozoan genera